Cruel Sun is the debut album by the band Rusted Root, released in 1992.

The album sold over 100,000 copies, which led to the band's major label recording contract.

Album cover

The album cover depicts a stylized image of the disc of Mictlantecuhtli, a Teotihuacan monolith, currently housed at the National Museum of Anthropology in Mexico City.

Critical reception
Trouser Press wrote that "despite the assistance of assorted sprites and faeries, Rusted Root’s rhythmic world music-influenced drivel is better suited for a Pringles commercial than a tribal gathering." MusicHound Rock: The Essential Album Guide called the album "an incredibly well-realized indie debut."

Track listing

All songs written by Michael Glabicki except where noted.
 "Primal Scream" (Bendin, Berlin, Glabicki) - 5:10
 "Send Me on My Way" - 4:57
 "Tree" (Berlin, Gablicki, Wertz) - 8:00
 "Won't Be Long" - 3:13
 "!@#*" - 0:40
 "Cat Turned Blue" - 4:03
 "Artificial Winter" - 3:37
 "Where She Runs" - 9:21
 "Martyr" - 5:19
 "Back to the Earth" (Buynak, Wertz, Glabicki) - 5:48
 "Scattered" - 4:34

Personnel

Liz Berlin  – Percussion, Drums, Vocals, Hand Drums
John Buynak  – Percussion, Drums, Vocals, Wind Instruments, Hand Drums
Jim Donovan  – Percussion, Drums, Hand Drums
Michael Glabicki  – Guitar, Vocals, Mixing
Patrick Norman  – Percussion, Bass Guitar, Sitar, Vocals
Jenn Wertz  – Percussion, Vocals

Production

Dave Bryan  – Producer, Mixing
Lara Lampenfield  – Photography, Sleeve Photo
Mike Michalski  – Producer
Randy Rhodes  – Engineer
Mark McNeely – Assistant Engineer
Rusted Root  – Writer, Producer

Recorded at Audiomation Studios in Pittsburgh, PA

References

1992 debut albums
Rusted Root albums